Peacock & Chinkara Breeding Centre, Jhabuwa is a 750-acre protected peacock (Indian peafowl) and chinkara reserve forest in Jhabuwa village 15 km south of Bawal in Rewari district in the Indian state of Haryana.

History
This centre of Forests Department, Haryana was officially opened on 4 October 2011 by then Chief Minister, Om Prakash Chautala. The state government will be providing about Rs.20 crore of funding for the centre over the next 20 years.

Reserve forest
The Jhabuwa reserve forest lies between Jhabuwa, Bidawas, Bhadoj and  Khijuri villages. Out of 750 acres reserve forest, 80 acres are allocated for the captive breeding of Chinkara and Indian peafowl. 20 Peaocks were tagged, with the help of Bombay Natural History Society, on legs and wing for the long-term study of movement and health. Those were released in the wild in February 2018.

See also
 Masani barrage
 CCS HAU, Bawal campus

References

Rewari district
Wildlife sanctuaries in Haryana
Pavo (genus)
Bird sanctuaries of India
2011 establishments in Haryana
Protected areas established in 2011
Animal breeding organisations in India